The Rajghat Dam is an inter-state dam project of the governments of Madhya Pradesh and Uttar Pradesh under construction on the Betwa River about 14 km from Chanderi in Madhya Pradesh and 22 km from Lalitpur in Uttar Pradesh.

Betwa River
Dams in Madhya Pradesh
Dams in Uttar Pradesh
Hydroelectric power stations in Uttar Pradesh
Lalitpur district, India
Masonry dams
2006 establishments in Madhya Pradesh
2006 establishments in Uttar Pradesh
Dams completed in 2006